Following ships of the Indian Navy have been named Brahmaputra:

INS Brahmaputra (F31) (1957) was a Type 41,  ordered for the Royal Navy as HMS Panther but transferred to India and renamed Brahmaputra before launching in 1957, commissioned in 1958. She was scrapped in 1986
INS Brahmaputra (F31) (1994) is a  commissioned in 2000

Indian Navy ship names